Fiona Sieber (born 14 February 2000) is a German chess player. She received the FIDE title of Woman International Master (WIM) in 2017.

Biography
In 2015, Fiona Sieber won international youth chess tournament Jugendmasters 2015. She has repeatedly represented Germany at European Youth Chess Championships and World Youth Chess Championships, where she won European Youth Chess Championship in 2016 in the U16 girls age group. She two times played for Germany in World Youth U16 Chess Olympiads (2014, 2016) and won individual bronze medal in 2014.

In German Chess Bundesliga she played for Magdeburg's chess club SG Aufbau Elbe Magdeburg.

References

External links
 
 
 

2000 births
Living people
German female chess players
Chess Woman International Masters